Thomas Goldwell (15013 April 1585) was an English Catholic clergyman, Bishop of Saint Asaph, the last of those Catholic bishops who had refused to accept the English Reformation.

Life
Thomas Goldwell was the son of William Goldwell of Great Chart, Kent. He is thought to have studied at Canterbury College, Oxford; in January 1532 a student surnamed Goldwell was questioned concerning books in his possession which supported Catherine of Aragon, and Goldwell later referred to Richard Thornden, who was warden of that College from 1524 to 1534, as his "old friend and master". He graduated BA in 1528, MA on 17 July 1531, and BTh on 20 March 1534. While at Oxford he attained more eminence in mathematics, astronomy, and kindred sciences, than in divinity or the humanities.

He became chaplain to Cardinal Pole and lived with him at Rome, where he was appointed  of the English Hospital of the Holy Trinity. Goldwell was attainted in 1539.

In 1547 he became a novice in the Theatine House of St. Paul, at Naples. On the death of Paul III, Cardinal Pole brought him to Rome as his personal attendant at the conclave of 1549-50 that elected of Pope Julius III. Goldwell then returned to Naples, and made his profession as a Theatine. In 1553, while Edward VI was still reigning an Act of General Pardon was passed, from which Goldwell had the signal honour of being specially excepted by name, along with Pole and some others.

On Mary's accession, Pole was named papal legate, and Goldwell returned with him to England. In 1555 Goldwell became bishop of St Asaph, a diocese largely within Wales. While still only bishop-designate, he was sent to Rome on 2 July 1555 to report on the state of religion in England to Paul IV, and probably received his episcopal consecration at that time. He returned to England and assisted at the consecration of Pole as Archbishop of Canterbury.

Mary planned to make him Bishop of Oxford and ambassador to Rome in November 1558, and the documents were drawn up, but were not enacted due to her death. When Elizabeth came to the throne, Goldwell attended Cardinal Pole's funeral by the new Queen's permission and then returned to St Asaph's. He complained of not being invited to her first parliament as a bishop.  It was alleged that, by his nomination to Oxford, he was no longer Bishop of St. Asaph; but that, as he had not done homage to the queen for Oxford, he was not yet bishop of that see. Not allowed to perform a bishop's office, say Mass, or administer the sacraments, as long as he remained in the country, by June 1559 he decided to leave England. Although the ports were being watched for him, he succeeded in making his escape.

In 1561 Goldwell became superior of the Theatines at San Silvestro, their house in Rome. He was the only English bishop at the last stages of the council of Trent, (Richard Pate, Bishop of Worcester, and Reginald Pole being at the earlier stages in the 1540s) and in 1562 was again attainted. In the following year he was appointed vicar-general to Carlo Borromeo, archbishop of Milan. Later, he returned to Rome, where he is known to have ordained the famous Spanish composer Tomás Luis de Victoria as a priest. In 1580, in spite of his advanced age, he set out for England at the head of the mission which included Campion and Persons, but he was taken ill at Reims and obliged to return to Rome.

At Pentecost in 1584 he ordained Camillus de Lellis to the sacred priesthood, the founder of the Order of Clerks Regular, Ministers of the Infirm (M.I.). De Lellis is the Catholic patron Saint of the Sick, hospitals, nurses and physicians.

Lord Thomas Goldwell died in Rome in 1585, the last surviving pre-Reformation bishop of Catholic England.

Episcopal succession
While bishop, he served as the principal consecrator of:

and the principal co-consecrator of:

Notes

References

1501 births
1585 deaths
Bishops of St Asaph.
16th-century English Roman Catholic bishops
Participants in the Council of Trent
Bishops of Oxford
Alumni of Canterbury College, Oxford
Alumni of All Souls College, Oxford
Theatine bishops